is a railway station in Nada-ku, Kobe, Hyōgo Prefecture, Japan. It is located at the southeastern corner of Ōji Park, which includes Ōji Stadium and the city zoo (Ōji Zoo).

Layout 
Ōji-kōen is an elevated station. It is served by two side platforms serving two tracks.

History 
The station opened on 1 April 1936.

The station building was relocated in October 1956.

Ōji-kōen Station was damaged by the Great Hanshin earthquake in January 1995. Restoration work on the Kobe Line took 7 months to complete.

Station numbering was introduced on 21 December 2013, with Ōji-kōen being designated as station number HK-14.

References

External links 

 Station website (in Japanese)

Railway stations in Hyōgo Prefecture
Hankyū Kōbe Main Line
Railway stations in Japan opened in 1936